Coca-Cola Beverages Philippines, Inc. (CCBPI, formerly Coca-Cola FEMSA Philippines, Inc.) is a Philippine-based company engaged in the bottling and distribution of Coca-Cola products in the country. CCBPI is part of the Bottling Investment Group (BIG), The Coca-Cola Company (TCCC)-owned bottling operation intent on building a foundation for long-term success. BIG's operations are primarily focused on markets in Southeast Asia, India, and Southwest Asia, covering 14 countries with 39 plants and 16,500 employees, serving 1.8 billion consumers.

CCBPI's current product portfolio includes 19 brands, such as Coke, Royal, Sprite, Wilkins, Viva, Thunder, Schweppes, and Minute Maid. It operates nationwide, with 19 manufacturing plants and approximately 50 sales offices and distribution centers—employing more than 9,700 regular employees.

The company was founded in 1981 as Coca-Cola Bottlers Philippines, Inc. and renamed Coca-Cola FEMSA Philippines, Inc. on January 25, 2013, after becoming jointly owned by Mexico-based Coca-Cola FEMSA, S.A. de C.V. and The Coca-Cola Company. The company was renamed Coca-Cola Beverages Philippines, Inc. in December 2018, after being acquired by the Bottling Investments Group (BIG) of The Coca-Cola Company.

History

In 1927, San Miguel Corporation (then known as the original San Miguel Brewery, Inc.) became the first international bottler of Coca-Cola. In 1981, San Miguel spun off its soft drink businesses to a new company named Coca-Cola Bottlers Philippines, Inc. (CCBPI). The company was established as a joint-venture between San Miguel Corporation (70%) and The Coca-Cola Company (30%).

Coca-Cola Amatil (1997)
In April 1997, CCBPI was merged into the Australia-based Coca-Cola Amatil Limited (CCA). In effect, San Miguel exchanged its 70% interest in a Philippine-only operation (CCBPI) for a 25% stake in CCA, which had operations in 17 countries—both in the Asia-Pacific region and in Eastern Europe. Shortly after, CCA demerged the Eastern European operations into a UK-based firm called Coca-Cola Beverages plc (resulting in a reduction of San Miguel's stake in CCA to 22%). Seeking to maintain its focus on the Asia-Pacific region, San Miguel sold its stake in the new UK entity in mid-1998.

Reacquisition by San Miguel and The Coca-Cola Company (2001)
In July 2001, San Miguel joined forces with The Coca-Cola Company (TCCC) to reacquire CCBPI, with San Miguel taking a 65% stake and TCCC the remaining 35%. As part of the deal, San Miguel sold its CCA shares back to CCA. Later in 2001, San Miguel sold its bottled water (Viva! and Wilkins) and juice businesses (Eight O'Clock), amalgamated under Philippine Beverage Partners, Inc., to CCBPI.

In February 2002, San Miguel completed the acquisition of an 83% stake in rival Cosmos Bottling Corporation in a P15 billion ($282 million) deal, completed through CCBPI. Cosmos specialized in low-priced soft drinks and held the number two position in the Philippine market. The combination of Coca-Cola Bottlers Philippines and Cosmos Bottling Corporation gave the San Miguel group control of more than 90% of the Philippine soft-drink market.

The Coca-Cola Company (2007)

In February 2007, The Coca-Cola Company (TCCC) purchased San Miguel's 65% shareholding in CCBPI and subsidiaries for $590 million acquiring the full ownership. In September 2010, TCCC announced its plan to invest US$1 billion in its business in the Philippines over the next five years. Part of this investment is the completion of its newest and technologically advanced Mega Plant in Misamis Oriental in January 2012.

Coca-Cola FEMSA (2013–2018)
On December 14, 2012, TCCC signed a definitive agreement to sell its 51% stake in CCBPI to Mexico-based Coca-Cola FEMSA, S.A. de C.V., the world's second largest bottler of Coca-Cola, with operations across Central and South America. The all-cash transaction became effective January 25, 2013. The deal price represented a $1,350 million valuation of CCBPI. Coca-Cola FEMSA will have an option to acquire the remaining 49% of CCBPI at any time during the next 7 years and will have a put option to sell its ownership back to TCCC any time during year six.

On August 17, 2018, The Coca-Cola Company announced that its Bottling Investments Group (BIG) agreed to acquire the 51% stake in the company held by Coca-Cola FEMSA, S.A. de C.V.

Coca-Cola Beverages Philippines (2018–present)
In December 2018, BIG completed its acquisition of Coca-Cola FEMSA Philippines' bottling operations. The company was then renamed Coca-Cola Beverages Philippines, Inc. as a reflection of its ambition to build a total beverages company.

Brands

Carbonated:
 Coca-Cola
 Coca-Cola Light Taste (formerly known as Diet Coca-Cola)
 Coca-Cola Zero Sugar
 Coca-Cola Zero Sugar Vanilla
 Coca-Cola thêm Cà Phê (also known as Coca-Cola with Coffee)
 Sprite
 Sprite Zero Sugar
 Sprite Lemon+
 Royal Tru-Orange
 Royal Tru-Grape
 Royal Tru-Lemon
 Sparkle
 Sarsi
 Pop Cola
 Schweppes (soda water, ginger ale and tonic water)
 Thunder Super Soda

Water:
 Viva! (mineral ice water)
 Wilkins Distilled (distilled water)
 Wilkins Pure (purified water)
 Wilkins Delight (water-based drink with real fruit juice)
 Wilkins Sparkling (plain, flavored)

Sports:
 Powerade

Juice:
 Minute Maid Pulpy
 Minute Maid Fresh
 Eight O'Clock (instant juice drink)
 Nutriboost 

Tea:
 Real Leaf (tea drink)
 Real Leaf Frutcy

Alcoholic beverages:
 Lemon-Dou (Chu-Hi alcoholic lemon cocktail drink)

Formerly available:

 Aquarius (plained and flavored water)
 Barq's
 Cheers
 Coca-Cola Life
 Coca-Cola Vanilla (imported)
 Fanta
 Earth & Sky (tea drink)
 First (pure drinking water)
 Hero Energy Drink
 Hi-C
 Jaz Cola
 Lift
 Magnolia/Eight O'Clock Fun-Chum
 Magnolia Zip
 Magnolia Fruit Drink
 Magnolia Junior Juice
 Mello Yello
 Nestea (ready-to-drink) - under license
 Nestea Blast (ready to drink iced tea in pouch)
 Ponkana (tangerine drink mix)
 Rani Float – under license
 Royal (soda water, ginger ale and tonic water)
 Royal Rootbeer
 Royal Wattamelon
 Royal Tru-Orange Light
 Royal Tru-Dalandan
 Royal Tru-Strawberry
 Samurai (energy drink)
 Sarsi Light
 Sprite Ice
 Sprite Light

See also
 Powerade Tigers

References

External links
Coca-Cola Beverages Philippines
Coca-Cola Philippines
The Coca-Cola Company

Coca-Cola bottlers
Drink companies of the Philippines
Philippine subsidiaries of foreign companies
Companies based in Bonifacio Global City
Food and drink companies established in 1981
Philippine companies established in 1981